Phillip Elmer White (May 17, 1900 – May 29, 1982) was an American football player.  He played college football as a halfback for the University of Oklahoma Sooners and was selected as a first-team player by Newspaper Enterprise Association for its 1920 College Football All-America Team. He later played professional football in the National Football League for the New York Giants (1925, 1927) and Kansas City Cowboys (1925).

References

External links

1900 births
1982 deaths
American football halfbacks
Kansas City Cowboys (NFL) players
New York Giants players
Oklahoma Sooners football players
All-American college football players
Sportspeople from Enid, Oklahoma
Players of American football from Oklahoma